Maria Michi (24 May 1921 – 7 April 1980) was an Italian supporting actress who worked with Roberto Rossellini on his two early neorealism masterpieces: Rome, Open City and Paisà.

Michi worked first as a typist at a law firm, then as an usherette at Teatro Quattro Fontane in Rome. She was noticed and given small parts in the company of Sergio Tofano and Diana Torrieri during the 1942-1943 season. Critic Irene Bignardi called her "a woman very near the resistance and the Communist Party". In 1948, she worked with Christian-Jaque in La Chartreuse de Parme. She was married in September 1949 to Duke Augusto Torlonia, and left the world of cinema for the theater, particularly working with director Guido Salvini. The marriage was annulled in San Marino in 1956. She resumed her film career in the 1960s and 1970s, when she did 12 films, including Bernardo Bertolucci's Last Tango in Paris and Tinto Brass's Salon Kitty, her last film.

Filmography 
1945: Roma, città aperta (directed by Roberto Rossellini) - Marina Marini
1946: Paisà (Paisan) (directed by Roberto Rossellini) - Francesca
1947: Fatalità (directed by Giorgio Bianchi) - Paola
1947: L'altra (directed by Carlo Ludovico Bragaglia) - Thea 'Angelo' Morelli
1947: Preludio d'amore (Shamed) (directed by Giovanni Paolucci) - Alida
1947: La Chartreuse de Parme (The Charterhouse of Parma) (directed by Christian-Jaque) - Marietta
1961:  (Law of War) (directed by Bruno Paolinell) - Signora Macumer
1969: The Lady of Monza, (original title is La monaca di Monza") (directed by Eriprando Visconti) - Sister Bianca Homati
1970: The Breach (directed by Claude Chabrol) - La troisième parque
1970: Mont-Dragon (directed by Jean Valère) - Hortense Dubois - la femme d'Armand
1972: What Have You Done to Solange? (directed by Massimo Dallamano) - Brenda's mother (uncredited)
1972: Last Tango in Paris (directed by Bernardo Bertolucci) - Rosa's mother
1973: Redneck (directed by Silvio Narizzano) - Princess
1973: Blu Gang e vissero per sempre felici e ammazzati (directed by Luigi Bazzoni) - Mama Blue
1975: Down the Ancient Staircase (directed by Mauro Bolognini)  - Folle
1975: Irene, Irene (directed by Peter Del Monte)  - Maria
1976: Salon Kitty (directed by Tinto Brass) - Ilde

References

External links
 

1921 births
1980 deaths
Actresses from Rome
20th-century Italian actresses